World Victory Road (WVR) is a defunct Japanese mixed martial arts (MMA) organization which promoted the Sengoku Raiden Championship (SRC) in Japan. The organization was formed in 2007 following the purchase of PRIDE FC by Zuffa. It operated in conjunction with the Japan Mixed Martial Arts Federation (JMM). The Sengoku championship was broadcast on Fuji TV and pay-per-view in Japan, and on HDNet in United States.

Beginning with the December 31 show, Sengoku was known as Sengoku Raiden Championship. "Raiden" means "thunder and lightning" and refers to legendary 18th century rikishi, Raiden Tameemon. WVR exec Kokuho said they hoped the initials "SRC" will be more palatable to international audiences.

On March 12, 2011, it was reported that Don Quijote, a Japanese discount store chain serving as the primary sponsor of the promotion, had ceased all funding to WVR. That same day, WVR officials issued a press release stating that, barring the sudden emergence of a new primary sponsor, the promotion was effectively finished.

Broadcast
The promotion received a boost in visibility in their endeavor to compete with DREAM when it reached a broadcast agreement for Fuji TV to televise matches in Japan. It was significant given the fact that this is the first MMA promotion to be televised on the network since it dropped PRIDE FC from its lineup in mid-2006. The events will be shown live on Fuji TV 739 and then a two-hour version later in the night on Fuji TV.

On February 6, 2009, HDNet announced they had reached and agreement with WVR to broadcast its Sengoku-events in America starting March 20, 2009.

Rules
WVR's rules differ somewhat from the Mixed martial arts rules#Unified Rules of Mixed Martial Arts.  Among the differences are the allowance of knees and stomps to the head of downed opponent while elbows to the head and soccer kicks are prohibited. Similar to the Unified Rules, fights have three rounds each lasting five minutes.

Sengoku events

Notable fighters

Final champions

Notable fighters
 Yoshihiro Nakao – Former  PRIDE fighter
 Sanae Kikuta – Former ADCC Submission Wrestling World Champion
 Hidehiko Yoshida – 1992 Judo Olympic Gold Medalist -78 kg
 Kazuo Misaki – 2006 PRIDE Welterweight Grand Prix winner
 Makoto Takimoto – 2000 Judo -81 kg Olympic Gold Medalist
 Satoru Kitaoka – Sengoku Lightweight Grand Prix and former Lightweight champion
 Hatsu Hioki – Current TKO Featherweight Champion
 Satoshi Ishii – 2008 Olympic Judo Gold Medalist +99 kg
 Eiji Mitsuoka – Former PRIDE fighter
 Kazuyuki Fujita – Former PRIDE fighter
 Satoshi Ishii − 2008 Judo Olympic Gold Medalist +100 kg
 Muhammed Lawal – a.k.a. King Mo Former NCAA Division II Champion, 2004 U.S. Olympic alternate -84 kg
 Kevin Randleman – Former UFC Heavyweight Champion
 Travis Wiuff – YAMMA Pit Fighting Heavyweight Tournament Champion
 Nick Thompson – Former BodogFight welterweight champion
 Josh Barnett – former UFC heavyweight champion, PRIDE veteran
 Jeff Monson – 2005 –99 kg ADCC champion
 Dave Herman – Elite XC, and Bellator veteran
 Logan Clark – UFC and WEC veteran
 Antônio Silva – Last EliteXC Heavyweight Champion
 Xande Ribeiro – 2007 –99 kg ADCC champion
 Antonio Braga Neto – 2008 World Jiu-Jitsu Gold Medalist
 Evangelista Santos – Former  PRIDE fighter
 Chan Sung Jung – 2007 Pancrase Korea Neo-Blood Tournament Champion
 Mu Bae Choi – 1990 Asian Games -100 kg Greco-Roman Wrestling Medalist
 Paweł Nastula – 1995 and 1997 Judo World Champion, 1996 Olympic Gold Medalist, -99 kg
 Mamed Khalidov – KSW champion, EliteXC veteran
 Stanislav Nedkov – Bulgarian jiu jitsu champion
 Blagoi Ivanov – 2008 World Sambo champion, +99 kg
 Badr Hari − K-1 World Grand Prix 2008 & 2009 Finalist
 Maximo Blanco -2007 Pan American Games Bronze Medalist, Lightweight King of Pancrase and current UFC fighter.

References

External links
 Sengoku Official site

 
Mixed martial arts organizations
Mixed martial arts in Japan
Sports organizations of Japan
2007 establishments in Japan
Sports organizations established in 2007
2011 disestablishments in Japan
Organizations disestablished in 2011